Garrett McLeod (born 12 May 1989) is a Canadian bicycle racer, who most recently competed for the  team.

Major results

2007
 8th Overall Tour de l'Abitibi
2014
 6th White Spot / Delta Road Race
 10th Overall Tour de Beauce

References

External links

1989 births
Living people
Canadian male cyclists
People from Kings County, Nova Scotia